KPW may mean:
 North Korean won or Korean People's Won, the currency of North Korea
kpw, ISO 639 code for the Kobon language